Joe Gerard, played by actor David Groh, is a fictional character on the television sitcom Rhoda, a spin-off of The Mary Tyler Moore Show.

Rhoda's Husband

While on vacation in New York City, Rhoda Morgenstern met Joe Gerard, a handsome divorcée with a young son who ran the New York Wrecking Company. Joe and Rhoda fell in love and eventually he invited her to live with him in his apartment; once she moved in, Rhoda decided she wanted to get married and, after a little hesitation, Joe finally agreed. After their wedding, Rhoda and Joe also lived in the same apartment building as Rhoda's sister, Brenda.

The first and second seasons of Rhoda centered on Joe and Rhoda's life as a married couple. However, in the first episode of the third season, they decided to separate after Joe revealed that he was restless and unhappy in their marriage. In the episode "Two Little Words - Marriage Counselor", Joe admitted that he never really wanted to remarry, and that he had only married Rhoda because she pressured him into it.

During the remainder of that season, Joe would pop in and out of Rhoda's life, but they never reconciled and in the episode "The Ultimatum", Rhoda finally issues Joe an ultimatum: either he can really try to make their marriage work, or she's going to start seeing other people. He tells her to see other people and exits the series. By the beginning of the fourth season, it was announced that their divorce was finalized.

Reception
Although the producers of Rhoda believed the plot development was essential, the fan response to Rhoda and Joe's separation in the third season was overwhelmingly negative and hostile. CBS was inundated with thousands of angry letters protesting the plot development, "Rhoda" and "Joe" received sympathy cards and letters of condolence, with Groh later reporting that he had received hate mail for as much as a year after the season had ended. This sentiment would translate into a steep ratings decline during the course of the season and the show ranked #32 for the 1976–77 season (falling from #7 the year before).

References

Television characters introduced in 1974
Fictional characters from New York City
Fictional construction workers
Gerard, Joe